Sainte-Marguerite-Marie is a municipality in the Canadian province of Quebec, located in La Matapédia Regional Council Municipality. It was known as Sainte-Marguerite until October 30, 2010.

The municipality had a population of 183 at the Canada 2021 Census.

Demographics

Canada Census data before 2001:
 Population in 1996: 235 (-9.6% from 1991)
 Population in 1991: 260

Municipal council
 Mayor: Marlène Landry
 Councillors: David Pelletier, Claudette Aubé, Nicole Lejeune, Sylvain Carrier, Jimmy Corbin, Line Landry

Political representation 

Provincially it is part of the riding of Matane-Matapédia. In the 2022 Quebec general election the incumbent MNA Pascal Bérubé, of the Parti Québécois, was re-elected to represent the population of Sainte-Marguerite-Marie in the National Assembly of Quebec.

Federally, Sainte-Marguerite-Marie is part of the federal riding of Avignon—La Mitis—Matane—Matapédia. In the 2021 Canadian federal election, the incumbent Kristina Michaud of the Bloc Québécois was re-elected to represent the population Sainte-Marguerite-Marie in the House of Commons of Canada.

See also
 List of municipalities in Quebec

References

Municipalities in Quebec
Incorporated places in Bas-Saint-Laurent
La Matapédia Regional County Municipality